Andrew Patterson is an American filmmaker. His debut feature The Vast of Night won the Best Narrative Feature Audience Award at the 2019 Slamdance Film Festival. Patterson was born in June 1982 and lives in Oklahoma.

Career
Patterson's interest in film started in his sophomore year in high school, when he worked as a film projectionist. Later he formed a production company, GED Media, in Oklahoma City producing commercials as well as promo shorts for the local basketball team Oklahoma City Thunder.

In 2016, Patterson started making his first feature film, which he financed himself, The Vast of Night. He also wrote the script under the pseudonym James Montague with Craig W. Sanger.  After being rejected by 18 film festivals, it finally premiered at the 2019 Slamdance Film Festival where it won Best Narrative Feature Audience Award, followed by wide critical attention. The film was acquired by Amazon Studios, and released in drive-in cinemas on May 15, 2020, and on Amazon Prime on May 29. He has since made an as-yet-untitled film, a revenge thriller set in the honeybee industry.

References

External links

1982 births
Living people
Film directors from Oklahoma
Place of birth missing (living people)